Hamlin is an unincorporated community in central Alberta in Smoky Lake County, located  south of Highway 28,  southwest of Cold Lake.

The community takes its name from Hamelin, England, the ancestral home of a first settler.

References 

Localities in Smoky Lake County